Toa or TOA may refer to:

Geography
 Cuchillas del Toa, biosphere reserve in Cuba
 The One Academy of Communication Design, an art college in Malaysia
 Toa Point, an area on Tutuila Island in American Samoa
 Toa River, a river in Cuba
 Zamperini Field, an airport in Torrance, California, United States; IATA airport code TOA

People
Ngāti Toa, a Māori tribe

Sciences
 TOA, a mnemonic in trigonometry
 TOA, the SAME code for a tornado watch
 Toas, Aboriginal artifacts
 Tubo-ovarian abscess, an infection of the ovary and Fallopian tube
 Type of Activity, a classification defined in the Australian and New Zealand Standard Research Classification

Popular culture
 Tales of the Abyss, a console role-playing game
 Time of arrival
 Toa, stage name of Tanoai Reed, a competitor on the TV show American Gladiators
 Toa (Bionicle), a fictional race of beings produced as constructible toys by Lego

Companies
 TOA Corporation, an electronics company of Kobe, Japan
 TOA Construction Corporation, or Tōa Kensetsu Kōgyō, a general contractor construction firm of Tokyo, Japan
 Toa Reinsurance Company, Limited, or Toa Re Group, a global reinsurance group of Tokyo, Japan
 TOA Technologies, a field service management company in the United States acquired by Oracle in 2014
 Toa-kai, a Yakuza syndicate based in Tokyo, Japan

See also

Tola (disambiguation)
Tova (disambiguation)